Acanthodactylus blanfordii, commonly called Blanford's fringe-fingered lizard, is a species of lizard in the family Lacertidae. The species is endemic to the Middle East and India.

Geographic range
Acanthodactylus blanfordii is found in SE Iran, S Afghanistan, SW Pakistan, N Oman (Muscat region), and India.

The type locality is "Perse et Béloutchistan ".

Etymology
Both the specific name, blanfordii, and the common name, Blanford's fringe-fingered lizard, are in honor of English naturalist William Thomas Blanford (1832 - 1905), member of the Geological Survey of India.

Reproduction
A. blanfordii is oviparous.

References

Further reading
Boulenger GA (1918). "Sur les lézards du genre Acanthodactylus Wiegm." Bull. Soc. zool. France 43: 143-155. (Acanthodactylus cantoris var. blanfordii, new variation, p. 154). (in French).
Salvador A (1982). "A revision of the lizards of the genus Acanthodactylus (Sauria: Lacertidae)". Bonner Zoologische Monographien (16): 1-167. ("Acanthodactylus blanfordi [sic]", pp. 151–155, Figures 103-105, Map 31).

blanfordii
Fauna of the Middle East
Reptiles described in 1918
Taxa named by George Albert Boulenger